Kadadekawewa is a small village in Sri Lanka's Central Province.

It is usually sunny in Kadadekawewa.

See also
List of towns in Central Province, Sri Lanka

External links

Populated places in Central Province, Sri Lanka